Neuse may refer to following, all in North Carolina:
 Neuse, North Carolina
 Neuse people, a Indigenous tribe that went extinct in the 18th century
 Neuse River
 Neuse Township, Wake County, North Carolina
 Neuse Correctional Institute
 Neuse Forest, North Carolina
 Cliffs of the Neuse State Park
or to the Confederate States Navy ship:
 CSS Neuse